Ivan Klapez, (born 1961) is a Croatian sculptor.

Early life and family 

Ivan Klapez has been based in London since 1987. Amongst his collectors are Sebastian Conran and he has produced several commissions such as ‘Liberty’, bronze, 1991, Commissioned by The Aims of Industry for The
Margaret Thatcher Award.

Notable works 

Klapez is known for his figurative sculptures such as the bronze sculpture "Unity" at London Wall, Alban Gate.

Gallery

References

External links 

 

1961 births
Living people
People from Sinj
Croatian sculptors
Modern sculptors
Croatian emigrants to the United Kingdom